The Chippewa Steel is a Tier II junior ice hockey team based in Chippewa Falls, Wisconsin, that plays in the North American Hockey League (NAHL).

History
The franchise began in 2005 as the North Iowa Outlaws based in Mason City, Iowa, where the team played for five seasons until moving to Onalaska, Wisconsin, in 2010 under owner Mark Motz as the Coulee Region Chill. The team was then sold to Michelle Bryant in 2012 and the franchise was eventually moved in 2014 to nearby La Crosse, Wisconsin, with games at the Green Island Ice Arena.

After the 2017–18 season, Chill owner Michelle Bryant sold the franchise to Steve Black of JB Black Enterprise, LLC, the owner of the NA3HL's New Ulm Steel. Black relocated the Chill franchise to Chippewa Falls, Wisconsin, as the Chippewa Steel to play out of Chippewa Area Ice Arena. Bryant would then rename her NA3HL team from La Crosse Freeze to Coulee Region Chill while continuing to play out of La Crosse. Al Rooney was named the Steel's first head coach and general manager, but was relieved of duties 23 games into his first season with a 5–16–1–1 record. Assistant coach Carter Foguth was named the interim head coach for the remainder of the season before be given the role permanently at the end of the season.

In March 2021, it was reported that Steve Black sold the Steel and the Tier III New Ulm Steel to an ownership group led by Kelly Kasik. The sale was confirmed on April 16 along with the announcement of new general manager and head coach Mike Janda. However, Janda was then given a two-year suspension in August 2021 by USA Hockey for manipulating records to use non-eligible players when he held a previous coaching job on a youth team and was subsequently released by the Steel. The Steel then hired Casey Mignone, the assistant coach of the St. Cloud Norsemen.

Season-by-season records

Playoffs
2007
First Round - Fargo-Moorhead Jets defeated North Iowa Outlaws 3-games-to-2
2008
First Round - Springfield Jr. Blues defeated North Iowa Outlaws 3-games-to-0
2009
First Round - Owatonna Express defeated North Iowa Outlaws 3-games-to-1
North Iowa Outlaws advance to Robertson Cup round robin as HOST
Robertson Cup Round Robin - North Iowa Outlaws (1-3) - Eliminated (L, 3-4 vs. Wild; L, 1-2 vs. Phantoms; L, 2-3 vs. Bobcats; W, 4-2 vs. Bandits)
2011
Division Semifinals - Coulee Region Chill defeated Owatonna Express 3-games-to-1
Division Finals - Bismarck Bobcats defeated Coulee Region Chill 3-games-to-2
2012
Division Semifinals - St. Louis Bandits defeated Coulee Region Chill 3-games-to-0
2015
First Round - Minnesota Wilderness defeated Coulee Region Chill 3-games-to-2
2016
Division Semifinals – Fairbanks Ice Dogs defeated Coulee Region Chill 3-games-to-1
2017
Division Semifinals – Janesville Jets defeated Coulee Region Chill 3-games-to-0

References

External links
 Chippewa Steel official website

North American Hockey League
Amateur ice hockey teams in Wisconsin
Chippewa County, Wisconsin
Ice hockey clubs established in 2018
2018 establishments in Wisconsin